The 1912 Giro d'Italia was the 4th edition of Giro d'Italia, one of cycling's Grand Tours, and marked four years since the first race in 1909. The Giro featured 56 riders — all of Italian descent — on 14 cycling teams, starting in Milan on 19 May and finishing in Bergamo on 4 June.

The 1912 edition of the Giro d'Italia was unique in that the general classification was a point system that was based on teams rather than individuals as in years past. The organizers limited the entrance of the race to teams of four, which meant there were no independent riders like in previous editions. According to a La Stampa article, there were six professional teams, six incorraggiamento teams, and one military team. The professional teams were Bianchi, Peugeot, Senior, Gerbi, Atala, and Legnano. The incorraggiamento teams were Goerike, Soriani, Soc. Ramella, Favero, Bolgona, and Bergami, while the military team was Stucchi. Each team wore specific, unique colored jersey while racing each day. 



Teams

Teams

References

1912 Giro d'Italia
1912